Real Mulia Football Club, commonly known as Real Mulia, or simply as Real, is a professional football club .
Founded in the end of 2014 as Kelab Bolasepak Real Mulia, the team has traditionally worn a dark blue home kit since. The word Real is a Spanish for Royal and was bestowed to the club by YAM Tengku Arif Temenggong Tengku Fahd Mua'adzam Shah Sultan Haji Ahmad Shah in 2014 together with the royal crown in the emblem. The team has played its home matches in the 2,000-capacity Maybank Stadium in downtown Bangi.

Real Mulia formerly play in the third-tier division of Malaysian football, the Malaysia FAM League. In 2015, the club has pulled from the league for financial reasons.

History

The Yunus era and building the club (2014–present)
Yunus Aliff became the first ever club head coach of Real Mulia. Later, it was announced that Azlan Bin Ahmad a former Perlis football player will be his assistant. Yunus has expressed his desire to build a "modern football team" in line with his philosophy. Yunus managed to establish a football squad within a short period of time of only two months for 2015 Malaysia FAM League campaign. To balanced the squad, Yunus decided to recruited several experienced players and mostly a former regulars from Malaysia Super League most notably is a former Malaysia national football team goalkeeper Mohd Syamsuri Mustafa.

Real Mulia also appointed former Perth Glory head coach ex-Socceroo international Alistair Edwards as a club technical director in order to provide advice or technical assistance on footballing or other aspects that are perceived as lacking or desired by the club.

Kit manufacturers and shirt sponsors

Stadium

Real Mulia have only had one home ground, Maybank Stadium, where they have played since the team's foundation.

Training ground
Real Mulia's training ground base is also located in Maybank Academy but beside the stadium. Inside the complex, the facilities are swimming pool , gymnasium and a rest house for players and coaching staff. On the grounds, there are one grass pitches. The training ground also being used for a low profiled friendly matches.

Rivalries
Real Mulia do not have a traditional rivalry on the scale of the JDT vs Pahang or Kelantan vs Terengganu. Matches against fellow Bangi side UKM and The Royals Derby sides Shahzan Muda from Pahang is always an exciting one but against Pahang FA have only taken place intermittently, due to the clubs often being in separate divisions.

Personnel

Current technical staff

{|class="wikitable"
|-
! style="color:#FFFFFF; background:#4169E1;"|Position
! style="color:#FFFFFF; background:#4169E1;"|Staff
|-
|Head Coach|| 
|-
|Assistant Head Coach|| 
|-
|Coach|| 
|-
|Goalkeeper coach|| 
|-
|Technical director|| 
|-
|Fitness coach||
|-
|Physio|| 
|-
|Medical director|| 
|-
|First team doctor|| 
|-
|Head of youth development|| 
|-
|Under 21 team manager|| 
|-
|Under 18 team manager|| 
|-

Management

 Last updated: 1 March 2015

Team

Squad

References

External links
 Official Facebook Page 
 Official Twitter Page 

Defunct football clubs in Malaysia
2014 establishments in Malaysia
Football associations in Malaysia
Football clubs in Malaysia
Association football clubs established in 2014